Kir Fard was a Byzantine or Armenian Roupenian nobleman who held the fortress of Kalonoros, later known as Alanya, until 1221, when it was besieged by the Seljuq Sultan Alaeddin Keykubad I. He surrendered his fortress in exchange for the fief of Akşehir, and gave his daughter Hunat Hatun in marriage to Kayqubad, who later fathered Kaykhusraw II.

References

External links 

People from Alanya
Armenian nobility
People of the Armenian Kingdom of Cilicia
History of Alanya